Adriana Melissa Flores Rivas (born 24 January 1991) is a Salvadoran former footballer who played as a forward. She has been a member of the El Salvador women's national team.

International career
Flores capped for El Salvador at senior level during two CONCACAF W Championship qualifications (2010 and 2014), the 2012 CONCACAF Women's Olympic Qualifying Tournament qualification and the 2013 Central American Games.

See also
List of El Salvador women's international footballers

References

1991 births
Living people
Salvadoran women's footballers
Women's association football forwards
El Salvador women's international footballers
Central American Games competitors